The Hirth HM 512 was a 12-cylinder development of the earlier, 6-cylinder HM 506, produced in the late 1930s.  Both were supercharged, inverted V, air-cooled engines.

Design and development
The HM 512 shared the same bore and stroke (105 mm × 115 mm) and 6:1 compression ratio with the rest of the HM500 series air-cooled engines. Other shared features were Hirth's use of roller bearings in the crankshaft and at both ends of connecting rods. The crankshaft was of typical Hirth multipart design, the 12-cylinders requiring 7 roller bearings.  Like the HM 508, the drive was geared down by 1:1.5.

Variants
HM 512AInitial version; take off power 400 hp (300 kW), continuous 360 hp (270 kW)
HM 512BTake off power 450 hp (335 kW), continuous 360 hp (270 kW)

Applications
 Dornier Do 212

Specifications (HM 512A)

References

Hirth aircraft engines
1930s aircraft piston engines